Krasue Valentine (also Ghost of Valentine) is a 2006 Thai romance-horror film written and directed by Yuthlert Sippapak. The film concerns the krasue ghost legend that is common in Southeast Asian countries.

Plot

Sao is a nurse who comes to work at an older, rundown hospital in Bangkok. Witnessing her arrival is Num, a disabled orderly. Num is shy, but a little girl selling roses convinces him to buy one. He gives her money and the girl in turn gives the rose to Sao, forming a bond between the two. Sao takes room in an old house behind the hospital, near a disused gymnasium and the old morgue. She is getting over a breakup with an old boyfriend who left her because she turns into a ghost. And, indeed, unbeknownst to her, she does turn into the krasue ghost that very night, scaring the hospital's security guard.

Cast
 Pitisak Yaowananon as Num
 Ploy Jindachote as Sao
 Kowit Wattanakul as Doctor
 Viyada Umarin as Paoun

See also
List of ghost films

External links
 

2006 films
2000s comedy horror films
Thai ghost films
Sahamongkol Film International films
Thai horror films
Thai-language films
2006 comedy films